Mary E. O'Connor (born 1959) is a former Chicago city alderman. She was the first female alderman to represent the 41st Ward of Chicago on the Northwest side of the city - the largest geographic ward in Chicago including O'Hare International Airport. She was elected with 50.88% of the total vote on April 5, 2011 in a runoff election, replacing outgoing alderman Brian Doherty.

Mary O'Connor is also the owner of Unforgettable Edibles and O'Connor's Deli and Market in the 41st Ward.

Mary O'Connor served the 41st Ward as Democratic Ward Committeeman from 2008 to 2015. 

O'Connor lost reelection as alderman to Anthony Napolitano in 2015.

After losing reelection, O'Connor was later hired by mayor Rahm Emanuel to work as the city's deputy commissioner in Planning and Development.

References 

1959 births
Living people
Chicago City Council members
Women city councillors in Illinois
American women in business
Businesspeople from Chicago